Shepard B. Trusty (May 10, 1860 – October 25, 1890) was an American Negro league pitcher in the 1880s.

A native of Philadelphia, Pennsylvania, Trusty played for the Cuban Giants in 1886 and 1887. In 14 recorded appearances on the mound, he posted a 2.84 ERA over 111 innings. Trusty died in Atlantic City, New Jersey in 1890 at age 30.

References

External links
Baseball statistics and player information from Baseball-Reference Black Baseball Stats and Seamheads

1860 births
1890 deaths
Cuban Giants players